The 1950 Bari Grand Prix was a non-championship Formula One motor race held on 9 July 1950 at the Lungomare Circuit, in Bari, Italy. It was the sixth race of the 1950 Formula One season. The 60-lap race was won by Alfa Romeo driver Giuseppe Farina. Juan Manuel Fangio finished second, also in an Alfa Romeo, and Stirling Moss third in an HWM-Alta.

Results

References

Race results are taken from and 

Bari Grand Prix
Bari